John Henry Batchelor MBE (1936-2019) was an English artist and technical illustrator, particularly known for his clear and detailed cutaway illustrations of vehicles and military equipment and stamp illustrations.  His work can be seen in many hundreds of late-20th-century works on armour, fighting vehicles, ships, firearms, etc. (for example the many works of Ian V. Hogg). Batchelor's work is particularly sought after by scale model makers for its accuracy. He provided illustrations for many magazines such as Radio Times, TV Times and technical interest publications such as  Popular Mechanics, Air & Space, and The Aeroplane.

Career 
Batchelor was born and brought up in Essex, leaving home aged 16 to travel the world for two years before joining the RAF aged 18.  After leaving the RAF he worked in the technical illustration departments of Bristol Aeroplane Company, Saunders-Roe (where he worked on the first hovercraft) and Martin-Baker, developing a hobby of drawing and painting antique pistols and becoming adept at portraying metal and wood finishes.

As a freelance illustrator he worked first on boys' papers including The Eagle, then in 1966 he became involved with Purnell's partwork History of the Second World War, for which he produced a total of 1163 illustrations.  This partnership extended to the same publisher's subsequent History of the First World War and Encyclopedia of modern Weapons and Warfare.

He was also commissioned by commercial organisations, notably Trans World Airlines, to produce reference illustrations for historical and technical publications.

During his career Batchelor designed 864 stamps for 49 countries in 25 years which probably makes him the world's premier stamp illustrator. The 49 countries don't include Great Britain, whose Post Office never answered the letters he sent over the years.  Batchelor’s stamp designs feature in his 2016 book John Batchelor’s World of Stamps: A Unique Collection.

Batchelor was appointed Member of the Order of the British Empire (MBE) in the 2013 New Year Honours for services to illustration. He also received awards from the American Institute of Graphic Arts and the Society of Illustrators.

Personal life 
John Batchelor lived in Dorset with his second wife, Elizabeth, whom he married in Canada in the early 1980s.

He died on 2 January 2019, aged 82.

References

 Publishing Solutions WWW Limited (archived 2014)

1936 births
Living people
English illustrators
Members of the Order of the British Empire